Maraekakaho is a rural settlement in the Hastings District and Hawke's Bay Region of New Zealand's North Island.

The main village was developed by Sir Douglas Maclean in the early 20th century, on a pastoral station established by his father, Sir Donald McLean, during the 19th century. The surrounding area includes lifestyle blocks, vineyards and wineries, orchards and pastoral farms.

Maraekakaho is a Māori name, translating as the area (marae) of the culm of the toetoe (kakaho); the grasses were once very common in the area.

A war memorial was set up in the settlement in 1986, commemorating the approximately 100 local men killed during World War I.

The Kereru Homestead and Station was established in 1857 on land purchased by the government from local Māori at the base of the Ruahine Ranges. It features mixed terrain, including flat land, rolling hills and ravines.

Demographics

Maraekakaho had a population of 1,392 at the 2018 New Zealand census, an increase of 81 people (6.2%) since the 2013 census, and an increase of 207 people (17.5%) since the 2006 census. There were 480 households, comprising 711 males and 684 females, giving a sex ratio of 1.04 males per female. The median age was 42.5 years (compared with 37.4 years nationally), with 318 people (22.8%) aged under 15 years, 195 (14.0%) aged 15 to 29, 711 (51.1%) aged 30 to 64, and 171 (12.3%) aged 65 or older.

Ethnicities were 93.1% European/Pākehā, 13.4% Māori, 1.1% Pacific peoples, 1.5% Asian, and 0.9% other ethnicities. People may identify with more than one ethnicity.

The percentage of people born overseas was 13.6, compared with 27.1% nationally.

Although some people chose not to answer the census's question about religious affiliation, 55.2% had no religion, 35.1% were Christian, 1.3% had Māori religious beliefs and 1.3% had other religions.

Of those at least 15 years old, 282 (26.3%) people had a bachelor's or higher degree, and 147 (13.7%) people had no formal qualifications. The median income was $41,600, compared with $31,800 nationally. 237 people (22.1%) earned over $70,000 compared to 17.2% nationally. The employment status of those at least 15 was that 654 (60.9%) people were employed full-time, 204 (19.0%) were part-time, and 18 (1.7%) were unemployed.

Education

References

Hastings District
Populated places in the Hawke's Bay Region